Jake A. Merrick is an American politician in the U.S. state of Oklahoma. He currently serves in the Oklahoma Senate as the elected member from the 22nd district. He was first elected as a Republican in the 2021 Oklahoma Senate special election to finish the term of Stephanie Bice after she vacated the office to become the U.S. representative for Oklahoma's 5th congressional district. He lost his re-election campaign for his first full term to a primary challenge from  Kristen Thompson.

Early life and career
Before running for office, Merrick worked as a licensed minister, bodybuilder, and personal trainer. He is a former pastor for Living Rivers Millennial Church in Tulsa, Oklahoma and former co-pastor for the Tabernacle of Praise in Edmond, Oklahoma. Merrick worked as a professor of theology and philosophy at Southwestern Christian University.  Merrick is also the co-owner of a construction company.

Oklahoma State Senate (2021–present)
While campaigning for the 2021 Oklahoma State Senate special election, Merrick stopped using Twitter entirely in favor of Facebook and Parler. He was endorsed by his predecessor Stephanie Bice and by the Governor of Oklahoma Kevin Stitt.

Merrick is one of the few "abortion abolitionists", people that seek to abolish access to abortion, elected in the Oklahoma Senate.

On April 14, 2021, Merrick was sworn into the Oklahoma Senate for the remainder of Stephanie Bice's term.

2022 re-election campaign
Merrick ran for re-election in 2022. He faced a primary challenge from Edmond business owner Kristen Thompson. Thompson out fundraised Merrick and was endorsed by Governor Kevin Stitt. On June 28, Thompson defeated Merrick in the Republican primary.

Electoral history

References

21st-century American politicians
Candidates in the 2020 United States elections
Living people
Republican Party Oklahoma state senators
Year of birth missing (living people)